The Main Post Office in New Brunswick, Middlesex County, New Jersey, United States was built in 1934.  Located in the Civic Square government district, It was designed in Neo-Georgian architecture by Wesley Sherwood Bessell.  It was listed on the National Register of Historic Places in 1984.

References

Buildings and structures in New Brunswick, New Jersey
Government buildings completed in 1934
National Register of Historic Places in Middlesex County, New Jersey
Post office buildings on the National Register of Historic Places in New Jersey
New Jersey Register of Historic Places
1934 establishments in New Jersey